Andy Roddick was the defending champion but lost in the final 3–6, 6–3, 6–4 against Andre Agassi.

Seeds
A champion seed is indicated in bold text while text in italics indicates the round in which that seed was eliminated.

  Andre Agassi (champion)
  Andy Roddick (final)
  James Blake (quarterfinals)
  Taylor Dent (first round)
  Vince Spadea (second round)
  Jan-Michael Gambill (first round)
  Robby Ginepri (withdrew because of a right hand injury)
  Hyung-Taik Lee (first round)

Draw

External links
 2003 U.S. Men's Clay Court Championships Draw

2003 Singles
Singles